The South American  Division (SAD) of Seventh-day Adventists is a sub-entity of the General Conference of Seventh-day Adventists, which oversees the Church's work in most of South America, which includes the nations of Argentina, Bolivia, Brazil, Chile, Ecuador, Peru, Paraguay, and Uruguay. Its headquarters is in Brasilia, Brazil. The Division membership as of June 30, 2021 is 2,545,366

Sub Fields
The South American Division is divided into four Union Conferences, ten Union Missions, and two Union of Churches Missions. These are divided into local Conferences and Missions.

 Argentina Union Conference 
Buenos Aires Conference 
Central Argentine Conference
Central West Argentine Mission 
North Argentine Conference 
North Buenos Aires Mission 
Northwest Argentine Mission 
South Argentine Conference 
Bolivia Union Mission 
Central Bolivia Mission 
East Bolivia Mission 
West Bolivia Mission 
Central Brazil Union Conference 
Central São Paulo Conference 
East São Paulo Conference 
São Paulo Conference  
São Paulo Valley Conference 
South São Paulo Conference  
Southeast Sao Paulo Conference 
Southwest São Paulo Conference 
West São Paulo Conference 
Chile Union Mission 
Central Chile Mission 
Central South Chile Conference 
Metropolitan Chile Conference 
North Chile Conference
Pacific Chile Mission 
South Austral Chile Conference 
South Metropolitan Chile Mission 
East Brazil Union Mission 
Bahia Conference 
Central Bahia Conference 
North Bahia Conference 
Sergipe Mission 
South Bahia Conference 
Southwest Bahia Mission 
Ecuador Union Mission 
North Ecuador Mission 
South Ecuador Mission
North Brazil Union Mission 
Maranhao Conference 
Northeast Maranhao Mission
North Para Conference 
Para-Amapa Mission 
South Maranhao Mission 
South Para Conference 
West Para Mission 
North Peru Union Mission 
East Central Peru Conference 
North Pacific Conference 
North Peru Mission 
Northeast Peru Mission 
West Central Peru Mission 
Northeast Brazil Union Mission 
Alagaos Mission 
Ceara Conference 
Central Pernambuco Conference 
Northeast Brazil Mission 
Pernambuco Conference 
Piaui Mission 
Northwest Brazil Union Mission
Amazonas-Roraima Conference 
Central Amazon Conference 
South Rondonia Conference 
West Amazon Conference 
Paraguay Union of Churches Mission 
South Brazil Union Conference 
Central Parana Conference 
Central Rio Grande Do Sul Conference 
North Parana Conference 
North Rio Grande do Sul Mission 
North Santa Catarina Conference 
Rio Grande Do Sul Conference 
Santa Catarina Conference 
South Parana Conference 
West Parana Conference 
South Peru Union Mission 
Central Andina Mission 
Central Peru Conference 
Central South Peru Mission 
East Peru Mission 
Lake Titicaca Mission 
South Peru Mission 
Southeast Peru Mission 
Southeast Brazil Union Conference 
Central Minas Conference 
East Minas Conference 
Espirito Santo Conference 
North Minas Mission 
Rio de Janeiro Conference 
Rio Fluminense Conference 
South Espirito Santo Conference 
South Minas Conference 
South Rio Conference 
West Minas Mission
Uruguay Union of Churches Mission 
West Central Brazil Union Mission 
Central Brazil Conference 
Central Planalto Conference 
East Mato Grosso Conference
South Mato Grosso Conference 
Tocantins Mission
West Mato Grosso Mission

History

See also
Seventh-day Adventist Church in Brazil
Seventh-day Adventist Church
List of Seventh-day Adventist hospitals
List of Seventh-day Adventist secondary schools
List of Seventh-day Adventist colleges and universities

References

History of the Seventh-day Adventist Church
Seventh-day Adventist Church in South America